The 1970 International Gold Cup was a non-championship Formula One race held at Oulton Park on 22 August 1970. The race was open to Formula One and Formula 5000 cars. It was run in two heats of 20 laps, with the winner decided on aggregate times. The starting grid for Heat 1 was decided by a qualifying session, in which John Surtees won pole position. The grid for Heat 2 was decided by the finishing order of Heat 1. John Surtees won Heat 1 and overall, narrowly beating Heat 2 winner Jochen Rindt, with Howden Ganley posting the best aggregate result of the Formula 5000 entrants. Jackie Stewart, debuting the brand-new Tyrrell 001, set fastest lap.

Qualifying
Blue background denotes F5000 entrants.

1Stewart started from the back of the grid

Classification
Blue background denotes F5000 entrants.

Heat 1

Heat 2

1Taylor stopped 1 lap early in error

Aggregate

References

International Gold Cup
International Gold Cup